The Ministry of Foreign Affairs (Abrv: MFA;) is the principal governmental department in charge of foreign relations for Thailand. The ministry is headed by the Minister of Foreign Affairs, who is also a member of the Cabinet of Thailand. The minister is appointed by the prime minister. The ministry is charged with formulating and executing foreign policies for the Kingdom of Thailand. The ministry manages and maintains Thai diplomatic missions around the globe.

History
Prior to the creation of the ministry, much of the country's foreign relations were handled by the absolute monarchs of the day. During the Kingdom of Ayutthaya foreign relations were handled by the "Krom Phra Khlang" ( (or the Treasury Department). The head of the department was known as "Phra Khlang" ( and occasionally referred to as "Berguelang" or "Barcelon" by foreign authors. A notable Phra Khlang Kosathibodi during the reign of King Narai was Kosa Lek, who was the elder brother of the famous 17th-century Siamese ambassador to France Kosa Pan. Kosa Pan also became a Phra Khlang Kosathibodi upon the reign of Petracha. Soon after, a sub-department called "Kromma Tha" ("Port Department") was created to deal with foreigners.

During the Bangkok Period most of these features were retained. For instance, the Chau Phaya-Phraklang in his capacity as Minister of State on behalf of Jessadabodindra negotiated the Siamese-American Treaty of Amity and Commerce of 1833 with Edmund Roberts in his capacity as Minister of the United States on behalf of President Andrew Jackson.

In 1840, King Mongkut, the next king, founded the Ministry of Foreign Affairs of the Kingdom of Siam, which was administered directly by the king. The responsibilities and roles of the old "Krom" were shifted to this ministry. Chao Phraya Bhanuwong became the first Foreign Minister of Siam in 1871, appointed by King Chulalongkorn. In 1881 Prince Devavongse Varoprakarn was appointed to replace him. Known today as the "father of Thai diplomacy" he reorganized and modernized the ministry to meet 19th century standards. The ministry was then permanently established at Saranrom Palace, east of the Grand Palace. The ministry was divided into seven divisions:

Senabodi Division (Ministerial Division)  
Under-Secretary Division 
Translation Division 
Reception Division
Accounts Division 
Filing Division 
Diplomatic Division
Consular Division

Foreign affairs advisers 
From 1892 to 1924, the Siamese government retained the professional legal services of lawyers skilled in international law.  
 Gustave Rolin-Jaequemyns, an international legal scholar, served as  Adviser-General from 1892 to 1902.
 Edward Strobel, a Harvard Law School Bemis Professor of International Law, served as American Adviser-General from 1906 until his death in 1908. He was followed by Harvard Law Professors Jens Westengard, Francis B. Sayre and Eldon James.

Reorganization 
After the Revolution of 1932, the ministry came under civilian control and the minister was made a member of the constitutional government of Siam. The first minister under this new system was Phraya Sri Visarn Vacha.

See more at: Foreign relations of Thailand

Operations
The MFA budget for FY2019 is 9,197.3 million baht.

Administration
Office of the Minister
Office of the Permanent Secretary

Functional departments
Department of Consular Affairs
Department of Protocol
Thailand International Cooperation Agency (TICA)
Department of International Economic Affairs
Department of Treaties and Legal Affairs
Department of Information
Department of International Organizations

Regional departments
Department of European Affairs
Department of American and South Pacific Affairs
Department of ASEAN Affairs (for international undertakings under the framework of ASEAN ; while bilateral relations between Thailand and each ASEAN member is under the East Asian Affairs Department)
Department of East Asian Affairs
Department of South Asian, Middle East and African Affairs

List of ministers
This is a list of Ministers of Foreign Affairs of Thailand:

1875–1885: Chao Phraya Panuwongse Maha Kosathibodi
1885–1923: Prince Devawongse Varopakarn
1924–1932: Prince Traidos Prabandh
1932–1933: Phraya Srivisaravaja
1933–1934: Phraya Abhibanrajamaitri
1934–1935: Phraya Phaholphonphayuhasena
1935–1936: Phraya Srisena
1936–1938: Pridi Banomyong
1938–1939: Chao Phya Sridharmadhibes
1939–1941: Plaek Pibulsongkram
1941: Direk Jayanama
1941–1942: Plaek Pibulsongkram
1942–1943: Luang Wichitwathakan
1943–1944: Direk Jayanama
1944–1945: Srisena Sampatisiri
1945–1946: Seni Pramoj
1946–1947: Direk Jayanama
1947: Thawan Thamrongnawasawat
1947: Arthakitti Banomyong
1947–1948: Phraya Srivisaravaja
1948–1949: Priditheppong Devakul
1949: Plaek Pibulsongkram
1949–1950: Pote Sarasin
1950–1952: Warakan Bancha
1952–1958: Prince Wan Waithayakon
1959–1971: Thanat Khoman
1971–1973: Thanom Kittikachorn
1973–1975: Charunphan Isarangkun Na Ayuthaya
1975: Bhichai Rattakul
1975–1976: Chatichai Choonhavan
1976: Bhichai Rattakul
1976–1980: Upadit Pachariyangkun
1980–1990: Siddhi Savetsila
1990: Subin Pinkayan
1990–1991: Arthit Ourairat
1991–1992: Arsa Sarasin
1992: Pongpol Adireksarn
1992: Arsa Sarasin
1992–1994: Prasong Soonsiri
1994–1995: Thaksin Shinawatra
1995: Krasae Chanawongse
1995–1996: Kasem S. Kasemsri
1996: Amnuay Viravan
1996–1997: Prachuab Chaiyasan
1997–2001: Surin Pitsuwan
2001–2005: Surakiart Sathirathai
2005–2006: Kantathi Suphamongkhon
2006–2008: Nitya Pibulsonggram
2008: Noppadon Pattama
2008: Tej Bunnag
2008: Saroj Chavanaviraj
2008: Sompong Amornwiwat
2008–2011: Kasit Piromya
2011–2014: Surapong Tovichakchaikul
2014–2015: Thanasak Patimaprakorn
2015–present: Don Pramudwinai

See also
Foreign relations of Thailand
Diplomatic missions of Thailand
Cabinet of Thailand
List of Government Ministers of Thailand
Government of Thailand

References

External links
Ministry of Foreign Affairs (Thai)
Ministry of Foreign Affairs (English)
Thai Government Links

 
Foreign Affairs
Foreign relations of Thailand
1840 establishments in Siam